NSLS can refer to:

 National Synchrotron Light Source
 Nova Scotia Lifeguard Service
 National Society of Leadership and Success